Pacific Division may refer to:
Pacific Division (NBA)
Pacific Division (NHL)
Pacific Division (hip hop group)
Pacific Division (U. S. Army)
Pacific States or Pacific Division, Division 9 of United States Census Bureau's Region 4: West